Sherzod Karimov (born 26 January 1989) is an Uzbekistan footballer currently playing for Surkhon Termez as a midfielder.

Career
Karimov has played for Shaykhontohur Toshkent, Qizilqum Zarafshon and currently Pakhtako]. he scored an important goal for Pakhtakor in the opening 2011 Asian Champions League group game against Al-Nassr of Saudi Arabia. The game finished 2-2.

He moved to the Chinese Super League side Qingdao Jonoon on a one-year loan deal on 28 February 2013. However, he failed to establish himself within the team and played six league matches (146 minutes in total, all coming on as a substitute) for Qingdao. On 22 May 2013, he scored a goal in the third round of 2013 Chinese FA Cup when Qingdao Jonoon beat second-tier club Harbin Yiteng 5–2. He returned to Pakhtakor Tashkent in June 2013.

International career
Karimov has represented Uzbekistan at four international levels, U-19, U-20, U-23 and senior team.

Honours

Club
Pakhtakor
 Uzbek League: 2012, 2014
 Uzbek League runners-up:  2009, 2010
 Uzbek Cup: 2009, 2011

References

External links
 
 

1989 births
Living people
Uzbekistani footballers
Uzbekistan international footballers
Uzbekistani expatriate footballers
Pakhtakor Tashkent FK players
Qingdao Hainiu F.C. (1990) players
PFC Lokomotiv Tashkent players
FC Qizilqum Zarafshon players
Navbahor Namangan players
Surkhon Termez players
Chinese Super League players
Uzbekistan Super League players
Footballers at the 2010 Asian Games
Association football midfielders
Asian Games competitors for Uzbekistan
Expatriate footballers in China
Uzbekistani expatriate sportspeople in China